Dimos (Greek: Δήμος) may refer to the following people:
Given name
Dimos Baxevanidis (born 1988), Greek football player
Dimos Dikoudis (born 1977), Greek basketball player
Dimos Manglaras (born 1940), Greek long jumper

Surname
 Jimmy Dimos (born 1938), American judge

See also
Dimo (name)

Greek masculine given names